Cyrus Alban Allen   (October 2, 1855 – April 21, 1915) was an American professional baseball player who played third base in 1879. He played collegiate ball at Western Reserve University and later got a dental degree at University of Pennsylvania.

External links

Baseball players from Illinois
Syracuse Stars (NL) players
Cleveland Blues (NL) players
19th-century baseball players
1855 births
1915 deaths
Major League Baseball third basemen
Case Western Spartans baseball players
People from Woodstock, Illinois
Lynn Live Oaks players
Buffalo (minor league baseball) players